Kanaanbadet (Kanaan beach), is a public beach by the lake Mälaren (a lake located outside Stockholm, Sweden). The beach is not far west of Blackeberg in the Hässelby-Vällingby area and is a part of Grimsta nature reserve.

The biblical name Kanaan was used for the first time in around 1730 and comes from an old croft that was built on the beach. By the end of the 18th century, a bigger house was built and it was later transformed into a tavern. The old tavern was torn down in 1881 and ''the king of Swedish snuff'' Knut Ljunglöf built a house & since 1952 it has been known as the Kanaan Cafe. Nowadays the beach is a popular place to go for people living west of Stockholm and it is often crowded on hot summer days. There is one cafeteria, 

a mini golf court and a small diving tower.

Sweden's first youth center was opened here in 1933 and during World War II it was a standby station for officers. Kanaan swimming society was named after the beach, when the club was founded in 1958. The club nowadays have their activities in different indoor pools around the west side. Stockholm's canoeing club Kanaanbadet has their club/boat house next to the beach. During the winter many upper secondary schools have their winter sports by and on the lake.

Kannan's allotment gardens are located about 1 km from the beach and consist of a field and 31 cottages surrounding it. This area was from the beginning a camping area in the 1950s, but later became a permanent allotment with a little space for gardening.

Geography of Stockholm
Mälaren
Public baths in Scandinavia